Semiheavy water is the result of replacing one of the protium in light water with deuterium. It exists whenever there is water with light hydrogen (protium, 1H) and deuterium (D or 2H) in the mix. This is because hydrogen atoms (hydrogen-1 and deuterium) are rapidly exchanged between water molecules. Water containing 50% H and 50% D in its hydrogen contains about 50% HDO and 25% each of H2O and D2O, in dynamic equilibrium.
In regular water, about 1 molecule in 3,200 is HDO (one hydrogen in 6,400 is D). By comparison, heavy water D2O occurs at a proportion of about 1 molecule in 41 million (i.e., one in 6,4002). This makes semiheavy water far more common than "normal" heavy water.

The freezing point of semiheavy water is close to the freezing point of heavy water at 3.8°C compared to the 3.82°C of heavy water.

References

Further reading 

 

Forms of water
Deuterated compounds